Mørkdalstuva or Mørkdalstua is the tallest mountain on the island of Hitra in the municipality of Hitra in Trøndelag county, Norway.

Name
The mountain is named after the Mørkdalen valley.  The last element is the finite form of tuve or tue which means "tussock". The valley name Mørkdalen is a compound of mørk which means "dark" and the finite form of dal which means "dale" or "valley".

References

Hitra
Mountains of Trøndelag